Yale is an unincorporated community in Crawford County, Kansas, United States.  As of the 2020 census, the population of the community and nearby areas was 81.  It is located northeast of Frontenac at the intersection of E 600th Ave and S 250th St, about 1 miles west of the Missouri state border.  The community is home to the Chicken Mary's and Chicken Annie's restaurants.

History
Yale was a mining town on the Missouri Pacific Railroad.

A post office was opened in Yale in 1892, and remained in operation until it was discontinued in 1914.

Demographics

For statistical purposes, the United States Census Bureau has defined Yale as a census-designated place (CDP).

References

Further reading

External links
 Crawford County maps: Current, Historic, KDOT

Unincorporated communities in Crawford County, Kansas
Unincorporated communities in Kansas